Mohammed Reeman (born 4 September 1996) is a Saudi Arabian footballer who plays as a left back for Al-Okhdood.

Honours
Al-Ittihad
King Cup: 2018

References

External links
 

Living people
1996 births
Saudi Arabian footballers
Ittihad FC players
Al-Raed FC players
Ohod Club players
Al-Okhdood Club players
Saudi Professional League players
Saudi First Division League players
Association football fullbacks